Aubrey Wray Fitch (June 11, 1883 – May 22, 1978) was an admiral of the United States Navy during World War II.  A naval aviator, he held important aviation-related commands both at sea and on shore from the 1920s onward.  He also served as superintendent of the United States Naval Academy.

Early life and career
Fitch was born in Saint Ignace, Michigan, on June 11, 1883. He entered the U.S. Naval Academy in the summer of 1902 and graduated on February 12, 1906. His Naval Academy classmates included Arthur L. Bristol, William L. Calhoun, William A. Glassford, Charles C. Hartigan, Frank J. Fletcher, Robert L. Ghormley, Isaac C. Kidd, John S. McCain Sr., Leigh Noyes, Ferdinand L. Reichmuth, Raymond A. Spruance, John H. Towers, Russell Willson, and Thomas Withers. After serving the two years of sea duty then required by law before being commissioned (serving on the armored cruiser  and the torpedo boat ), Fitch became an ensign on February 13, 1908.

Upon completion of the torpedo course, Fitch helped to fit out the battleship , which commissioned on April 4, 1910, before returning to Annapolis for consecutive tours of duty at the Naval Academy, first as assistant discipline officer between 1911 and 1912 and later as an instructor of physical training from 1912 to 1913. Service in the destroyers  and  followed before he received his first sea command, the destroyer , with the 2nd Division, Reserve Torpedo Flotilla, Atlantic Fleet.

After serving on the staff of the commander in chief, Atlantic Fleet, Fitch assumed command of the yacht  in January 1915, with additional duty as aide to the commander in chief.

World War I and afterward
Relieved of command of Yankton shortly after the United States entered World War I in the spring of 1917, Fitch continued his staff duties for another five months before joining  to serve as her gunnery officer for the remainder of hostilities, as that dreadnought operated with the 6th Battle Squadron, Grand Fleet.

After the armistice, Fitch again served at the Naval Academy once more before becoming, concurrently, inspector of ordnance in charge of the Hingham Naval Ammunition Depot in Hingham, MA, and naval inspector of ordnance in charge at the Naval Coaling Station, Frenchman Bay, Maine.

Aviation
He reported for aviation instruction at the Naval Air Station Pensacola, Florida, in June 1929 and there won his wings as a naval aviator on February 4, 1930. Relieved from that billet a little over a year later (July 1931), he then began a year as commanding officer of the Navy's first aircraft carrier, .

Subsequently, attending the Naval War College, Newport, Rhode Island, from June 1937 to May 1938, Fitch completed the senior course there before assuming command of NAS Pensacola, in June 1938. The outbreak of hostilities in the Pacific in December 1941 thus found Fitch one of the most experienced carrier commanders afloat.

World War II
Fitch's flagship, Saratoga, figured prominently in the abortive attempt to reinforce Wake Island in December 1941 and was later torpedoed off Oahu in late January 1942, seriously cutting American carrier strength in the Pacific at a critical period.

Rear Admiral Fitch relieved Vice Admiral Wilson Brown on April 3, 1942, breaking his flag in Lexington, his former command. That engagement, the first in history where neither side came within surface gun range of the other, effectively stopped the Japanese thrust at the strategic Port Moresby, but resulted in the first loss of an American aircraft carrier in the war— the USS Lexington, sunk on May 8, 1942.

Fitch together with Captain Frederick C. Sherman and the Lexington's executive officer, Commander Morton T. Seligman, visited "Lady Lex"'s wounded in Minneapolis''' sickbay—an action that "contributed in no small measure to the patients' well-being." For the leadership he exhibited during the Battle of the Coral Sea, Fitch was awarded his first Distinguished Service Medal.

He again broke his flag in his former flagship, Saratoga'', but the task group formed around that ship arrived too late to take part in the pivotal Battle of Midway.

On September 20, 1942, six weeks after the first American amphibious operation of the war got underway at Guadalcanal, Fitch assumed command of Aircraft, South Pacific Force. Not a desk-bound admiral, he carried out numerous, hazardous flights into the combat zones, inspecting air activities incident to the selection of bases for projected operations. For these, he received a Distinguished Flying Cross.

Under Fitch's command, AirSoPac—ultimately encompassing not only Navy but Army, Marine Corps, and Royal New Zealand air units—achieved great success in aiding the Allied campaign in the South Pacific. Fitch's planes protected Allied shipping, providing vital air cover that strongly assisted the Allies in challenging, and ultimately defeating, the Japanese in the Solomons. In addition, his aircraft performed essential reconnaissance missions, spotting enemy warships prior to the Battle of Santa Cruz Islands in October 1942 and during the Naval Battle of Guadalcanal in November 1942.

Later, Fitch oversaw the early experiments in conducting night bombing utilizing radar (a concept which paid great dividends in interdicting Japanese shipping) and encouraged the use of specially modified aircraft to obtain photographic intelligence. In addition, for his skillful coordination of the Allied air effort in that area of the world Fitch received a gold star in lieu of a second Distinguished Service Medal.

Fitch returned to Washington in the summer of 1944 and became the Deputy Chief of Naval Operations (Air). He skillfully and efficiently directed the aeronautical organization of the Navy, oversaw efforts to assure the readiness and deployment of air units, and planned all of the related logistics measures. For these efforts he received the Legion of Merit.

Post-war service

After V-J Day, Vice Admiral Fitch assumed duty as the superintendent of the Naval Academy on August 16, 1945, and held that post until January 15, 1947, with collateral duty as commandant, Severn River Command. The first aviator to head the Naval Academy, Fitch was instrumental in establishing the Department of Aeronautics, authorized by the Navy on November 28, 1945.

Subsequent to heading the academy, Fitch served briefly in the Office of the Undersecretary of the Navy before becoming the senior member of the Naval Clemency and Prison Inspection Board in March 1947. He was so serving when he retired from the Navy and was relieved of all active duty on July 1, 1947.

Admiral Fitch died due to a heart ailment combined with a bout with pneumonia in Newcastle, Maine, his adopted state, on May 22, 1978, shortly before his 95th birthday.

Namesake
In 1981, the U.S. Navy guided-missile frigate  was named in Admiral Fitchs honor.

The main road to the former NAS Brunswick, is named Admiral Fitch Avenue in his honor.

TV & movie portrayals
Fitch was portrayed by Mitchell Ryan in the television version of Midway (1976 film)

Gallery

See also

List of Superintendents of the United States Naval Academy

References

Fitch, Aubrey W., Admiral, USN, Naval Historical Center, Department of the Navy.

External links
hazegray.org/danfs/ biography of VADM Fitch

1883 births
1978 deaths
People from St. Ignace, Michigan
United States Naval Aviators
Recipients of the Navy Distinguished Service Medal
Recipients of the Legion of Merit
Recipients of the Distinguished Flying Cross (United States)
Superintendents of the United States Naval Academy
United States Naval Academy alumni
United States Navy admirals
United States Navy World War II admirals
Burials in Maine
Military personnel from Michigan
20th-century American academics